Eospilarctia naumanni is a moth of the family Erebidae first described by Aidas Saldaitis, Povilas Ivinskis, Thomas Witt and Oleg Pekarsky in 2012. It is found in the Kachin region of northern Myanmar.

The wingspan is about 54 mm for males and 55 mm for females. The forewing veins are yellow on a brown background. The hindwings are white yellow with brown spots.

Etymology
The species is named after Mr Stefan Naumann, a Saturniidae specialist.

References

Moths described in 2012
Spilosomina